Ken Kotyk (born February 7, 1981) from Rama, Saskatchewan is a Canadian bobsledder who has competed since 2003. He won two medals in the four-man event at the FIBT World Championships with a silver in 2007 and a bronze in 2005.

Kotyk also finished fourth in the four-man event at the 2006 Winter Olympics in Turin.

Ken now resides in Calgary, Alberta with his wife Andrea Kotyk. He now works as a fitness instructor.

References
Bobsleigh four-man world championship medalists since 1930
CBC.ca profile
FIBT profile

1981 births
Bobsledders at the 2006 Winter Olympics
Canadian male bobsledders
Living people
Olympic bobsledders of Canada
Sportspeople from Saskatchewan
People from Rama, Saskatchewan
Canadian people of Ukrainian descent